The following is a list of notable people from Santa Barbara, California.

Notable people in Santa Barbara
 Elizabeth Laura Adams, writer
 Dylan Axelrod, Major League Baseball player
 Jeff Bridges, actor
 Ashleigh Brilliant, cartoonist and writer
 Ariana Grande, singer-songwriter
 Ellen DeGeneres, comedian and actress
 Prince Harry, Duke of Sussex, sixth in line of succession to the British throne.
 Prince Archie of Sussex, seventh in the line of succession to the British throne. 
Princess Lilibet of Sussex, eighth in the line of succession to the British throne.
 Meghan, Duchess of Sussex, wife of Prince Harry, Duke of Sussex
 Edwin Burr Babbitt, U.S. Army major general
 Colleen Ballinger, YouTube personality
 Red Barrett, Major League Baseball player
 Bobby Beausoleil, former member of the Manson Family, currently serving life imprisonment for the murder of his friend Gary Hinman
 Ryan Church, Major League Baseball player
 Kami Craig, Olympic water polo player
 Randall Cunningham, National Football League player
 Shawn Dailey, musician
 Jay Dee Daugherty, drummer
 Marko DeSantis, musician
 Dean Dinning, musician, music producer, bassist
 Dishwalla, post-grunge alternative rock band
 Anthony Edwards, actor
 Cynthia Ettinger, actress 
 Chip Foose, actor
 Tyler Fredrickson, National Football League player, TV personality
 Keith Gledhill, tennis player
 Phillip Gonyea, musician
 Sue Grafton, author
 Parry Gripp, musician
 Mary C. F. Hall-Wood (d. 1899), poet, editor, author
 Cole Hauser, actor
 Marianna Hill, actress
 Eric Christopher Houston, mass-murderer
 Cady Huffman, actress
 Kathy Ireland, supermodel
 Jason Johnson, Major League Baseball player
 William Lassiter, U.S. Army major general
 Jan Lee, former Oregon State Representative
 Chuck Liddell, mixed martial artist
 Alex D. Linz, actor
 The Little Heroes, indie rock band
Rob Lowe, actor
 Alex Mack, National Football League player
 George K. McGunnegle, U.S. Army officer
 Randy Mantooth, actor
 Margaret Millar, writer
 Kim Miyori, actress
 Maika Monroe, professional kiteboarder, actress
 Harriet Moody, architect
 Luke Mullen, actor, filmmaker, environmentalist
 Todd Nichols, musician and member of Toad the Wet Sprocket
 Floyd Norman, animator, writer, comic book artist
 Monica I. Orozco, historian, archivist
 Charles A. Ott, Jr., United States Army Major General, director of the Army National Guard
 Katy Perry, singer-songwriter
 Jeffrey Peterson, technology entrepreneur
 Lakey Peterson, professional surfer
 Glen Phillips, singer-songwriter
 Ben Rattray, founder of Change.org
 Michael Redmond, professional Go player
 Todd Rogers, professional beach volleyball player
 Charles R. Schwab, financial executive, founder of Charles Schwab & Co (world's largest discount stockbroker), multi-billionaire
 Edie Sedgwick, actress, model
 Jeff Serr, radio personality, voice actor
 Scott Sipprelle, 2010 Republican nominee for Congress (NJ-12)
 Patricia Soltysik, aka Mizmoon, member of the Symbionese Liberation Army
 Donald Spence, musician
 Jeffrey C. Stewart, Professor of Black Studies and Pulitzer Prize winner
 Ryan Spilborghs, Major League Baseball player
 Sugarcult, rock band
 James Arnold Taylor, voice actor
 Mia Talerico, actress
 Toad the Wet Sprocket, folk rock band
 Shaun Tomson, South African world champion surfer
 Oprah Winfrey, host
 David Woodard, conductor
 Felix Wormser, engineer and U.S. government official

References

 
Santa Barbara
Santa Barbara, California